Tapes and Crates is the second EP from the Toronto rap group The 20/20 Project.  It was released independently on August 28, 2015 via iTunes and for free on the Urbnet Records bandcamp page. Singles released include "Got it Made" "Spit"  and "Nevermore", the latter accompanied with a music video

Track listing

References

2015 EPs
The 20/20 Project albums